Harrison Township is a township in Gloucester County in the U.S. state of New Jersey. As of the 2020 United States census, the township's population was 13,641, an increase of 1,224 (+9.9%) from the 2010 census count of 12,417, which in turn reflected an increase of 3,629 (+41.3%) from the 8,788 counted in the 2000 census.

Harrison Township was originally formed as Spicer Township by an act of the New Jersey Legislature on March 13, 1844, from portions of Greenwich Township and Woolwich Township. That name lasted for less than a year, with Harrison Township adopted as of April 1, 1845. The township was named for President William Henry Harrison.

From Prohibition until 2018, Harrison Township had been a dry township, where alcohol could not be sold. The township's voters passed a referendum in 2009 permitting alcohol by consumption in restaurants. A second referendum was passed by the voters in 2015 allowing sales of packaged alcoholic goods in liquor stores. The first liquor store opened in November 2018 and the first bar opened in July 2019.

Geography
According to the U.S. Census Bureau, the township had a total area of 19.02 square miles (49.25 km2), including 18.93 square miles (49.03 km2) of land and 0.08 square miles (0.22 km2) of water (0.44%).

Mullica Hill is an unincorporated community and census-designated place (CDP) located within Harrison Township that had a 2010 Census population of 3,982. Richwood is a CDP that is in portions of both Harrison Township and Mantua Township, which had a 2010 population of 3,459, of which 3,400 were in Harrison Township and 59 in Mantua Township. Other unincorporated communities, localities and place names located partially or completely within the township include Ewan, Ewans Mills, Heritage, Jefferson, and Sherwin.

The township borders the Gloucester County municipalities of East Greenwich Township, Elk Township, Glassboro, Mantua Township, and South Harrison Township and Woolwich Township.

Multiple homes were destroyed when the area was hit by a strong EF3 tornado on September 1, 2021, produced by the remnants of Hurricane Ida.

Demographics

2010 census

The Census Bureau's 2006–2010 American Community Survey showed that (in 2010 inflation-adjusted dollars) median household income was $102,162 (with a margin of error of +/− $10,851) and the median family income was $121,366 (+/− $9,400). Males had a median income of $88,157 (+/− $6,618) versus $47,857 (+/− $10,273) for females. The per capita income for the borough was $36,354 (+/− $2,640). About 5.0% of families and 5.5% of the population were below the poverty line, including 7.4% of those under age 18 and 2.8% of those age 65 or over.

2000 census
As of the 2000 United States census, there were 8,788 people, 2,848 households, and 2,323 families residing in the township. The racial makeup of the township was 95.16% White, 2.96% African American, 0.13% Native American, 0.73% Asian, 0.41% from other races, and 0.61% from two or more races. Hispanic or Latino of any race were 1.78% of the population.

There were 2,848 households, out of which 49.9% had children under the age of 18 living with them, 71.8% were married couples living together, 7.3% had a female householder with no husband present, and 18.4% were non-families. 15.3% of all households were made up of individuals, and 5.0% had someone living alone who was 65 years of age or older.  The average household size was 3.06 and the average family size was 3.44.

In the township, the population was spread out, with 33.2% under the age of 18, 5.6% from 18 to 24, 33.7% from 25 to 44, 20.8% from 45 to 64, and 6.6% who were 65 years of age or older. The median age was 35 years. For every 100 females, there were 98.5 males. For every 100 females age 18 and over, there were 95.5 males.

The median income for a household in the township was $77,143, and the median income for a family was $84,379. Males had a median income of $61,770 versus $39,583 for females. The per capita income for the township was $28,645.  About 2.1% of families and 3.2% of the population were below the poverty line, including 2.5% of those under age 18 and 7.7% of those age 65 or over.

Government

Local government 
Harrison Township is governed under the Township form of New Jersey municipal government, one of 141 municipalities (of the 564) statewide that use this form, the second-most commonly used form of government in the state. The Township Committee is comprised of five members, who are elected directly by the voters at-large in partisan elections to serve three-year terms of office on a staggered basis, with either one or two seats coming up for election each year as part of the November general election in a three-year cycle. At an annual reorganization meeting held each January, the Township Committee selects one of its members to serve as Mayor and another as Deputy Mayor, each serving a one-year term.

, the members of the Harrison Township Committee are Mayor Louis Manzo (I, term on committee ends December 31, 2024; term as mayor ends 2022), Deputy Mayor Julie DeLaurentis (I, term on committee ends 2023; term as deputy mayor ends 2022), Michelle Powell (I, 2024), John Williams (R, 2022) and Adam Wingate (R, 2022).

Federal, state, and county representation 
Harrison Township is located in the 2nd Congressional District and is part of New Jersey's 5th state legislative district. Prior to the 2011 reapportionment following the 2010 Census, Harrison Township had been in the 3rd state legislative district.

Politics
As of March 2011, there were a total of 7,889 registered voters in Harrison Township, of which 1,903 (24.1%) were registered as Democrats, 2,533 (32.1%) were registered as Republicans and 3,447 (43.7%) were registered as Unaffiliated. There were 6 voters registered as Libertarians or Greens.

In the 2012 presidential election, Republican Mitt Romney received 56.9% of the vote (3,561 cast), ahead of Democrat Barack Obama with 41.8% (2,612 votes), and other candidates with 1.3% (81 votes), among the 6,292 ballots cast by the township's 8,439 registered voters (38 ballots were spoiled), for a turnout of 74.6%. In the 2008 presidential election, Republican John McCain received 52.3% of the vote (3,280 cast), ahead of Democrat Barack Obama with 45.7% (2,867 votes) and other candidates with 1.1% (68 votes), among the 6,273 ballots cast by the township's 7,975 registered voters, for a turnout of 78.7%. In the 2004 presidential election, Republican George W. Bush received 58.0% of the vote (3,039 ballots cast), outpolling Democrat John Kerry with 40.7% (2,132 votes) and other candidates with 0.6% (42 votes), among the 5,236 ballots cast by the township's 6,540 registered voters, for a turnout percentage of 80.1.

In the 2013 gubernatorial election, Republican Chris Christie received 73.8% of the vote (2,515 cast), ahead of Democrat Barbara Buono with 24.6% (839 votes), and other candidates with 1.5% (52 votes), among the 3,454 ballots cast by the township's 8,407 registered voters (48 ballots were spoiled), for a turnout of 41.1%. In the 2009 gubernatorial election, Republican Chris Christie received 59.5% of the vote (2,214 ballots cast), ahead of  Democrat Jon Corzine with 31.7% (1,178 votes), Independent Chris Daggett with 7.1% (265 votes) and other candidates with 0.6% (23 votes), among the 3,718 ballots cast by the township's 7,900 registered voters, yielding a 47.1% turnout.

Education 
Harrison Township School District serves students in public school for pre-kindergarten through sixth grade. As of the 2018–19 school year, the district, comprised of two schools, had an enrollment of 1,385 students and 107.6 classroom teachers (on an FTE basis), for a student–teacher ratio of 12.9:1. Schools in the district (with 2018–19 enrollment data from the National Center for Education Statistics) are
Harrison Township Elementary School with 753 students in grades Pre-K–3 and 
Pleasant Valley School with 629 students in grades 4–6.

Public school students in seventh through twelfth grades attend the schools of the Clearview Regional High School District, which serves students from Harrison Township and Mantua Township. Schools in the district (with 2018–19 enrollment data from the National Center for Education Statistics) are 
Clearview Regional Middle School with 831 students in grades 7–8, and Clearview Regional High School with 1,450 students in grades 9–12.

Students from across the county are eligible to apply to attend Gloucester County Institute of Technology, a four-year high school in Deptford Township that provides technical and vocational education. As a public school, students do not pay tuition to attend the school.

Friends School Mullica Hill is a private, nonsectarian, coeducational day school located in the Mullica Hill section of Harrison Township that was established in 1969 and now serves students pre-kindergarten through eighth grade.

Guardian Angels Regional School (Pre-K–Grade 3 campus in Gibbstown and 4–8 campus in Paulsboro) takes students from Mullica Hill. It operates under the supervision of the Roman Catholic Diocese of Camden.

Transportation

Roads and highways

Several major roadways pass through Harrison Township. The New Jersey Turnpike runs through the township for a tenth of a mile, but the nearest interchange is just over the border in neighboring Woolwich Township. U.S. Route 322 passes through the center of town, concurrent with County Route 536. State routes include Route 45, Route 55 and Route 77. The other major county road that goes through is County Route 581.

Public transportation
NJ Transit bus service is available between Bridgeton and Philadelphia on the 410 route.

Wineries
 Heritage Vineyards

Notable people

People who were born in, residents of, or otherwise closely associated with Harrison Township include:

 Jay Accorsi (born 1963), college football coach at Rowan University
 John Brancy (born 1988), operatic baritone
 Jeff Datz (born 1959), professional baseball scout and a former Major League Baseball player and coach
 Wilbur Evans (1905–1987), actor and singer who performed on the radio, in opera, on Broadway, in films, and in early live television
 Bob Folwell (1885–1928), pioneering football player and coach
 Samuel Gibbs French (1818–1910), author and Confederate General during the Civil War
 Big Daddy Graham (1953–2021), comedian, writer, actor, recording artist and sports radio personality on 94 WIP-FM
 John W. Hazelton (1814–1878), represented New Jersey's 1st congressional district from 1871 to 1875
 Gregg Murphy, sports journalist who has been a broadcaster for the Philadelphia Phillies
 Nathan T. Stratton (1813–1887), represented New Jersey's 1st congressional district in the United States House of Representatives from 1851 to 1855
 Al Szolack (born ), retired basketball player best known for his time spent on the Washington Generals, the traveling exhibition team best known for their spectacular losing streak in exhibition games against the Harlem Globetrotters
 Lawrie Tatum (1822–1900), Quaker who was best known as an Indian agent to the Kiowa and Comanche tribes at the Fort Sill agency in Indian Territory
 Michelle Tumolo (born 1991), women's lacrosse coach and former player who is the Head Coach of the Army Black Knights women's lacrosse team

References

External links

 

 
1844 establishments in New Jersey
Populated places established in 1844
Township form of New Jersey government
Townships in Gloucester County, New Jersey